Pedro Gonçalvo (born 13 March 1964) is a Mozambican sprinter. He competed in the men's 4 × 400 metres relay at the 1984 Summer Olympics.

References

External links
 

1964 births
Living people
Athletes (track and field) at the 1984 Summer Olympics
Mozambican male sprinters
Olympic athletes of Mozambique
Place of birth missing (living people)